Pavel Anatolyevich Konovalov (born January 10, 1967) is a Russian sprint canoeist who competed in the mid-to-late 1990s. He won six medals at the ICF Canoe Sprint World Championships with a gold (C-4 200 m: 1994), three silvers (C-4 200 m: 1997, C-4 500 m: 1993, C-4 1000 m: 1993), and two bronzes (C-4 200 m and C-4 500 m: both 1998).

Konovalov also finished sixth in the C-2 500 m event at the 1996 Summer Olympics in Atlanta.

References

Sports-reference.com profile

1967 births
Canoeists at the 1996 Summer Olympics
Living people
Olympic canoeists of Russia
Russian male canoeists
ICF Canoe Sprint World Championships medalists in Canadian